The 1998 Nottingham Open was an ATP tournament held in Nottingham, Great Britain. The tournament was held from 15 June to 22 June 1998.

Second-seeded Jonas Björkman won his second title of the year and the 16th of his career.

Finals

Singles

 Jonas Björkman defeated  Byron Black, 6–3, 6–2

Doubles

 Justin Gimelstob /  Byron Talbot defeated  Sébastien Lareau /  Daniel Nestor, 7–5, 6–7, 6–4

References

External links
 ITF tournament edition details

 

 
Nottingham
Nottingham Open